The 1990 Virginia Slims of Chicago was a women's tennis tournament played on indoor carpet courts at the UIC Pavilion in Chicago, Illinois in the United States and was part of the Tier I  category of the 1990 WTA Tour. It was the 19th edition of the tournament and was held from February 12 through February 18, 1990. First-seeded Martina Navratilova won the singles title, her 10th at the event and earned $100,000 first-prize money.

Finals

Singles

 Martina Navratilova defeated  Manuela Maleeva-Fragniere 6–3, 6–2
 It was Navratilova's 1st singles title of the year and the 147th of her career.

Doubles

 Martina Navratilova /  Anne Smith defeated  Arantxa Sánchez Vicario /  Nathalie Tauziat 6–7(9–11), 6–4, 6–3

References

External links
 ITF tournament edition details
 Tournament draws

Virginia Slims of Chicago
Ameritech Cup
Virginia Slims of Chicago
Virginia Slims of Chicago
Virgin